Tapan Kumar Deka commonly known as Tapan Deka (born 25 February 1963) is the 28th Director of Intelligence Bureau of India. Deka is an Indian Police Service (IPS) officer (Himachal Pradesh cadre) of the 1988 (41RR), Deka was empanelled as Director general of police level in 2021. Deka's tenure as the Director of Intelligence Bureau started from 1 July as his predecessor Arvind Kumar's tenure ended on June 30, 2022.

Deka earlier denied the post of the Director general of police of Himachal Pradesh.

During his police service, Tapan Deka mostly worked with the Intelligence Bureau of India. He has been considered a Top Spy and close aide of Ajit Doval. He joined the Intelligence Bureau in 1998.

Early life and Academic 
Deka was born on 25 February 1963, in Tezpur, Assam in an Assamese family. He holds a Master's Degree in Physics. He was a AASU leader and selected for Indian Police Service (IPS) in his first attempt.

Police Career 

 Tapan Deka was appointed as the counter-terrorism operations chief in Kashmir.
 Tapan Deka has formally served as Deputy Director, Joint Director, and Additional Director, Special Director at Intelligence Bureau.

During Citizenship Amendment Act protests in Assam, Tapan Deka handled the protest to bring normalcy as per the advice of Home Minister of India Amit Shah.

He was also the head of investigation of the 2008 Assam bombings case. He also handled the investigation of Pathankot air base attack and Pulwama attack, and was the brain behind the arrest of Yasin Bhatkal, founder of Indian Mujahideen (IM), from Nepal. Deka is believed to the key official of the surgical strike in Balakot, Pakistan.

Awards 
 President's Police Medal for distinguished service in 2012.

Footnotes 
Sardar Vallabhbhai Patel National Police Academy - No.11011/10/2018-Trg-UR(1988-41 RR)

Notes

References 

Indian Police Service officers
1963 births
Living people
Intelligence Bureau (India)